The Mercedes-Benz W18 was a six-cylinder automobile introduced as the Mercedes-Benz Typ 290 in 1933. It was a smaller-engined successor to the manufacturer’s Typ 350 / 370 Mannheim  model.   In terms of the German auto-business of the 1930s it occupied a market position roughly equivalent to that filled by the Mercedes-Benz E-Class in the closing decades of the twentieth century. The W18 was replaced in 1937 by the manufacturer’s W142 (Typ 320).      

Several different models with names incorporating the number “290” were produced by Mercedes-Benz during the 1930s, so that for the avoidance of ambiguity the car is frequently identified using the manufacturer's Works Number as the Mercedes-Benz W18.

Engine and running gear 
Power was delivered to the rear wheels via a four-speed manual transmission with synchromesh on the top two ratios. On standard-bodied cars, the 1:1 ratio was achieved with third gear, leaving the fourth ratio as an “overdrive” ratio. The rear wheels were attached to a swing axle while at the front a lateral leaf spring was complemented by a pair of coil springs. The footbrake applied stopping power to all four wheels via a hydraulic control mechanism.

Mercedes-Benz Typ 290 (short chassis) 1933–1937 
The shorter cars sat on a  wheelbase. The bodies closely resembled those fitted on the Typ 200 (W21) models of the same period, although the bodies fitted on the Typ 290s were actually a little larger. A car fitted with the least expensive of the standard W18 bodies, which was a 4-seat six-light “Limousine” (sedan/saloon), was listed by the manufacturer at 7,950 Marks. A four-door Torpedo-bodied 4-door “Tourenwagen” was priced at 9,500 Marks, and there were also, from the start, no fewer than three different standard cabriolet bodies with two or four doors and between two and four seats, designated as the “Cabriolet B”, the “Cabriolet C” and the “Cabriolet D”. In 1936 these were joined by a fourth, more sporting, “Cabriolet A” which was  lower than the other standard-bodied cars.

The manufacturer also made the W18 available in bare chassis form for customers preferring to specify a bespoke body from an independent coachbuilder. In addition a significant number of quasi-Jeep military Kübelwagen were produced based on the same chassis and mechanical components.

Mercedes-Benz Typ 290 (long chassis) 1934–1937 

A year after the appearance of the shorter-bodied car, a longer  wheelbase became available. All the body types offered for the shorter car were now also offered for the longer one. In addition there was a six-seater "Pullman-Limousine" and a cabriolet version of the six-seater-bodied car designated the “Cabriolet F”. A “Roadster” cabriolet was added in 1936. .

Long chassis cars came with different transmission ratios whereby the 1:1 ratio matched fourth gear and there was no overdrive. The final drive ratio was also raised for the longer cars.

Commercial 
Mercedes-Benz produced 7,495 W18 passenger cars, of which 3,566 sat on the shorter chassis while 3,929 used the longer chassis. The German auto-market in the middle 1930s absorbed roughly 200,000 passenger cars annually. In its strongest years (1934 and 1935) the W18 was selling at the rate of approximately 2,000 cars annually implying a market share of very roughly 1%.

In addition to the cars, 719 quasi-Jeep military W18 Kübelwagen were produced.

References
  Werner Oswald: Mercedes-Benz Personenwagen 1886–1986, Motorbuch-Verlag, Stuttgart 1987, 
 

W18
1930s cars
W18
Rear-wheel-drive vehicles
Sedans